Uvaa is a 2015 Indian comedy and social drama film, written and directed by Jasbir Bhatti and produced by Dhanraj Films   about five friends in a boarding school and their daily life suddenly turning into a rebellious fight for justice and making an example for the outside world. The film stars Om Puri, Sanjay Mishra, Vikrant Rai , Jimmy Sheirgill, Sangram Singh, Rohan Mehra, and Archana Puran Singh, and includes several new faces as the lead actors of the film.

Plot
Anil (Rohan Mehra), Vikram (Lavin Gothi), Salmaan (Mohit Baghel) and Deenbandhu (Bhupendra "Megh" Singh) are rebellious brats of suburban Delhi NCR.  With the world at their feet and nothing to worry about, they stomp everything in their path without caring about consequences.  When the five are placed in the totally new world of convent school, they face new challenge. Their goal is to survive and thrive only to find romance, but one night they encounter a horrifying event which puts them in the hands of law. Their lives change forever as they have to fight for justice and moral integrity to make an example for the world.

Cast

 Om Puri as Hukum Pratap Chaudhary
 Jimmy Sheirgill as S.P Tejaveer Singh
  Aarun Nagar as Inspector Prithvi Singh
 Manish Chaudhary as Lawyer Pramod Mittal
 Archana Puran Singh as Lawyer Jayshri Bhatiya
 Sangram Singh as Coach Sangram Singh
 Raju Mavani as Divan
Ravi Verma as a Sub-inspector
 Rohan Mehra as Anil Sharma
 Mohit Baghel as Salman Khan
 Poonam Pandey as Pooja
 Sheena Bajaj as Rashmi
 Neha Khan as Mala
 Rajit Kapoor as Principal
 Elena Kazan as English Teacher Kanaklata
 Sanjay Mishra as Hindi Teacher Vyakulji
 Jyoti Kalash as Jailor
 Vinti Idnani as Nisha
 Yukti Kapoor as Roshni
 Jeetu Shivhare as Drama Teacher Sala Sir
  Shefali Singh as Yoga Teacher
 Gautam Gilhotra as Music Teacher
 Parikshit Sahni as Judge
 Vraddhi Sharma as Jyoti
 Vicky Aahuja as Shrikant Tyagi
 Padam Singh as Girish Sharma
 Lavin Gothi as Vikram Tyagi
 Vicky Roy as Ram Pratap Singh
 Bhupendra  "Megh" Singh as Deenbandhu

Soundtrack

The music for Uvaa has been composed by Rashid Khan, Palash Muchal & Praveen-Manoj. The lyrics have been given by Bhupendra Singh Megh and Shiv Singh.

Critical response

Renuka Vyavahare of The Times of India said that, "Uvaa (read youngsters) is one of those many films which touches upon a relevant topic but fails to capitalise on its potential." The critic gave the film a rating of 2 out of 5 and concluded her review saying that, "shoddy execution mars this potentially significant social drama." Shaheen Parkar of Mid-Day gave the film a rating of 1.5 out of 5 and said that, "there’s nothing in the storyboard that enthralls you even for a few minutes." Martin D'Souza of Glamsham gave the film a rating of 2 out of 5 saying that, "If only director Jasbir Bhatti had dwelt on the subject rather than concentrating on silly school scenes and even sillier teachers, we would have had a hard-hitting film on our hands." Bollywood Life gave the film a rating of 1 out of 5 saying that, "Overall, the film is a poor attempt at driving home a relevant social message. A perfect case of good intention, bad execution."

References

External links
 
 

2015 comedy-drama films
Indian comedy-drama films
2010s Hindi-language films
2015 films
2015 comedy films